Sir John Barker, 4th Baronet (1655 – 14 August 1696) was an English baronet and Tory politician.

He was the second son of Sir John Barker, 2nd Baronet and Winifred Parker, daughter of Sir Philip Parker. In 1665, he succeeded his older brother Jermy as baronet. Barker was educated at Merton College, Oxford.

In 1680, he entered the British House of Commons and sat as Member of Parliament (MP) for Ipswich until his death in 1696.

Barker married Bridget Bacon, daughter of Sir Nicholas Bacon. They had a daughter and a son. Barker was succeeded in the baronetcy by his only son William.

References

1655 births
1696 deaths
Baronets in the Baronetage of England
English MPs 1680–1681
English MPs 1681
English MPs 1685–1687
English MPs 1689–1690
English MPs 1690–1695
English MPs 1695–1698
Members of the Parliament of England (pre-1707) for Ipswich
Alumni of Merton College, Oxford